French ship Vaillant or Vaillante may refer to:

French ship Vaillant (1756)
French brig Vaillante (1793)
French corvette Vaillante (1796)
French ship Vaillant (1801)

French Navy ship names